On 12 September 2018, a man deliberately drove his SUV into crowds on a square in Mishui near Hengyang in Hunan Province, China. The attack resulted in the deaths of 15 people and injuries to 43 others. The attacker, Yang Zanyun, was sentenced to death and executed.

Attack
The attack happened at about 7:35 p.m. when a Land Rover SUV was driven onto a square in Mishui and deliberately struck people. When the vehicle came to a stop, the suspect got out and continued his attack with a shovel and a knife.

Suspect and investigation
The suspect was identified as 54-year-old Yang Zanyun, who was living off interest from loans. He had a long criminal record that included previous convictions for selling drugs, theft and attacking people.

The government said Yang wanted to take "revenge on society." Three months after the attack, on December 12, Yang was sentenced to death and deprived of his political rights for the remainder of his life. The sentence was approved by the Supreme People's Court and he was executed on January 29, 2019.

See also
 List of rampage killers (vehicular homicide)

References 

2018 murders in China
2018 road incidents
2010s road incidents in Asia
History of Hunan
Mass murder in 2018
21st-century mass murder in China
September 2018 crimes in Asia
September 2018 events in China
Vehicular rampage in China